The southern grosbeak-canary, also known as Kenya grosbeak-canary (Crithagra buchanani) is a species of finch in the family Fringillidae. It is found in Kenya and Tanzania. Its natural habitat is subtropical or tropical dry shrubland.

The southern grosbeak-canary was formerly placed in the genus Serinus but phylogenetic analysis using mitochondrial and nuclear DNA sequences found that the genus was polyphyletic. The genus was therefore split and a number of species including the southern grosbeak-canary were moved to the resurrected genus Crithagra.

References

southern grosbeak-canary
Birds of East Africa
southern grosbeak-canary
Taxonomy articles created by Polbot